Mosharraf Hossain may refer to:

 Mir Mosharraf Hossain (1847–1912), Bengali Indian novelist
 M. H. Khan (1932–2018), Chief of Bangladesh Navy
 Musharrof Husain Khan (born 1933), Bangladeshi academic, Vice-Chancellor of Bangladesh University of Engineering and Technology
 Musharraf Hussain (born 1958), British-Pakistani religious scholar
 Mosharrof Hossain (born 1978), Bangladeshi kabaddi player
 Mosharraf Hossain (cricketer) (1981–2022), Bangladeshi cricket player
 Mosharraf Hossain (boxer), Bangladeshi boxer

Politicians
 Mosharraf Hossain (Jessore politician) (–1974), Bangladesh Awami League and JASAD politician, Member of the Constituent Assembly of Bangladesh
 A. K. M. Mosharraf Hossain (–2020), Bangladesh Nationalist Party politician from Mymensingh and a former state minister of energy
 Mosharraf Hossain (Bangladesh politician, died 2014) (–2014), Bangladesh Nationalist Party from Feni
 Khandaker Mosharraf Hossain (born 1942), Bangladesh Awami League politician from Faridpur and a former minister of LGRD
 Mosharraf Hossain (Netrokona politician), (–2010), Bangladesh Awami League politician
 Mosharraf Hossain (politician), known as Engineer Mosharraf Hossain, (born 1943), Bangladesh Awami League politician from Chittagong and Minister of Housing
 Khandaker Mosharraf Hossain (BNP) (born 1946), Bangladesh Nationalist Party politician from Comilla and a former minister of health
 Mosharraf Hossain (Bogra politician), Bangladesh Bogra-4 MP first elected in 2018